Bill Whittaker (1930 in Queensland – 2009 in Sydney) was in the horse racing hall of fame in Melbourne for being a horse racing journalist.

References 

1930 births
2009 deaths
Australian Thoroughbred Racing Hall of Fame inductees
20th-century Australian journalists